Thomas Ray Bryden (born January 17, 1959) is an American former professional baseball player who played one season for the California Angels of Major League Baseball (MLB) in 1986.

Bryden attended Gonzaga University, where he played college baseball for the Bulldogs from 1980 to 1981.

References

External links

1959 births
Living people
American expatriate baseball players in Canada
Baseball players from Washington (state)
California Angels players
Danville Suns players
Edmonton Trappers players
Gonzaga Bulldogs baseball players
Idaho Falls Angels players
Major League Baseball pitchers
Midland Angels players
People from Moses Lake, Washington
Portland Beavers players
Redwood Pioneers players
Waterbury Angels players